Ge Hongsheng (Chinese: 葛洪升; pinyin: Gě Hóngshēng; 1931 – 30 January 2020) was a politician of the People's Republic of China, and the former Governor of Zhejiang.

Early life 
In 1931, Ge was born in Jü County, Shandong Province, China.

Career 
Ge joined the Communist Party of China in 1948. In 1988, he was elected the vice secretary of CPC Zhejiang committee. In November, 1990, Ge was appointed as vice governor and the acting governor of Zhejiang. He was confirmed as governor in March 1991 and served in this post till February 1993. In March 1998, Ge was elected vice director of Finance and Economic Committee of 9th National People's Congress.

Ge was an alternate member of 13th Central Committee of the Communist Party of China, and a standing committee member of 9th National People's Congress.

He died on 30 January 2020, aged 88.

References

External links 

1931 births
2020 deaths
People's Republic of China politicians from Shandong
Politicians from Rizhao
Governors of Zhejiang
Chinese Communist Party politicians from Shandong